CA129 can refer to:
Air China Flight 129
California State Route 129